CIDER International School is an English medium school in Chittagong, Bangladesh.

History
CIDER International School was established in 1997 by a group of social activists. It was initially to be part of a larger movement, the Chittagong Institute for Development of Education and Research (CIDER).

Organisation
CIDER conducts its academic activities on its own campus on six acres of land. The school is coeducational, with approximately 1000 students playing sports.

Curriculum
The institution offers two curricula: the British curriculum, under Cambridge International Examinations, and the English-language version of the national curriculum.

Affiliations
CIDER is affiliated with the University of Cambridge International Examinations. It is also affiliated with Board of Intermediate and Secondary Education, Chittagong which endorses the National Curriculum in its streams.

Achievements 
The school won the national 2008 Aktel Debate Championship for English medium schools. In 2016, Mayisha Mahdiya Sultana of Cider achieved the highest grades in O and A level exams in the entire Bangladesh to date. Following her studies at CIDER, she attended Princeton University and the University of Oxford. Notable alumni also includes Dr. Yamin Bin Baqui and Dr. Yasir Bin Baqui who completed their PhD from the University of Cambridge on aerospace engineering. Prior to that, they had also studied at MIT, Harvard and NUS.

References

High schools in Bangladesh
Cambridge schools in Bangladesh
1997 establishments in Bangladesh
Educational institutions established in 1997
Schools in Chittagong